Khal Torabully is a Mauritian poet. Born in Mauritius in 1956, in the capital city Port Louis, his father was a Trinidadian sailor and his mother was a descendant of migrants from India and Malaya.

Work
Khal Torabully left for Lyon in 1976, to study at the University of Lyon II. After studies in comparative literature, Torabully wrote a PhD thesis in semiology of poetics with Michel Cusin.

Khal Torabully has won several literary awards, among which [Lettres-Frontière] (Switzerland), [Prix du Salon du Livre Insulaire] (France) and [Prix Missives] (France).

Films
 Pic Pic, Nomade d’une île, 1996.
 La traboule des vagues, multibroadcast Tele Lyon Metropole.
 Malcolm de Chazal, (52’), portrait of an artist, with France Telecom.
 Portraits de Mémoire en Gironde, France, 2010.
 The Maritime Memory of the Arabs, Oman TV, Chamarel Films, France 2001.

References

1956 births
Living people
20th-century Mauritian writers
20th-century French poets
People from Port Louis District
Mauritian people of Indian descent
Mauritian people of Trinidad and Tobago descent
Mauritian people of Malaysian descent
French male poets
French people of Indian descent
French people of Trinidad and Tobago descent
French people of Malaysian descent
21st-century Mauritian writers
21st-century French poets
University of Lyon alumni